William Lash Miller, CBE, FRSC (10 September 1866, Galt, Ontario – 1 September 1 1940, Toronto) was a Canadian chemist, chemistry professor, and pioneer of physical chemistry.

Lash Miller studied chemistry at the University of Toronto with bachelor's degree in 1887. He then studied from 1887 to 1889 under August Wilhelm von Hofmann, in 1889 under Viktor Meyer in Göttingen, and in 1890 in Munich, where he received his doctorate in organic chemistry under Adolf von Baeyer. Subsequently, he studied with Wilhelm Ostwald in Leipzig, which was a turning point in his chemistry career. From then on, he often spent summers in Ostwald's laboratory in Leipzig. In 1891 Lash Miller became a demonstrator at the University of Toronto and was again in 1892 with Wilhelm Ostwald in Leipzig, where he earned a second doctorate (in physical chemistry). At the University of Toronto, Lash Miller became in 1894 a lecturer, in 1900 an associate professor, and in 1908 a professor of physical chemistry in Toronto. In 1937 he retired as a professor emeritus.

Lash Miller was considered one of the most important Canadian chemists at the time of his death. He built up the teaching of physical chemistry in Canada and was also one of Canada's first representatives of physical chemistry (and clinical biochemistry), with which he dealt from about 1915. With Ostwald he devoted much of his scientific efforts to implement Gibbs' very theoretical concepts on a laboratory scale. Lash Miller did research on many areas of physical chemistry; in particular, he extended Gibbs' treatment of multicomponent systems.

Miller served as the doctoral advisor of biochemist Clara Benson.

Miller was elected to the Royal Society of Canada in 1899 and served as its President for 1934–1935. He was one of the main organizers of the Canadian Institute of Chemistry and was in 1926 its president. In 1926 he became the first Canadian honorary member of the American Chemical Society. He was a member of the editorial staff of the Journal of the American Chemical Society and of The Journal of Physical Chemistry A. He was made Commander of the Order of the British Empire in 1935. The Lash Miller Chemical Laboratories building, at the University of Toronto, is named in his honor.

Chemist William Lash Miller is not to be confused with lawyer William Miller Lash, his double cousin (first cousin on both sides).

Selected publications
 On the Conversion of Chemical Energy into Electrical, Journal of Physical Chemistry, 10 (1892), 459–466
 with F. J. Smale: Introduction to qualitative analysis, 1896
 On the Second Differential Coefficients of Gibbs Function ζ. The Vapor Tensions, Freezing and Boiling Points of Ternary Mixtures, Journal of Physical Chemistry, 1 (1896–1897), 633–642
 Chemical and Physical Reactions, 1902
 On the Mechanism of Induced Reactions, 1907
 The Theory of the Direct Method of Determining Transport Numbers, Journal of Physical Chemistry, 69 (1910), 436–441
 with T.R. Rosebrugh: Mathematical Theory of Changes in Concentration at the Electrode. Brought About by Diffusion and by Chemical Reactions, Journal of Physical Chemistry, 14 (1910), 816–885
 The Influence of Diffusion on Electromotive Force Produced in Solutions by Centrifugal Action, Transactions of the Electrochemical Society, 21 (1912). 209–217
 Toxicity and Chemical Potential, Journal of Physical Chemistry, 24 (1920), 562–569
 The Method of Willard Gibbs in Chemical Thermodynamics, Chemical Reviews, 1 (1924-1925), 293–344
 with A.R. Gordon: Numerical Evaluation of Infinite Series and Integrals Which Arise in Certain Problems of Linear Heat Flow, Electrochemical Diffusion, etc., Journal of Physical Chemistry, 35 (1931), 2785–2884

References

External links 

 Miller Family archival papers held at the University of Toronto Archives and Records Management Services

University of Toronto alumni
Ludwig Maximilian University of Munich alumni
Academic staff of the University of Toronto
Canadian Commanders of the Order of the British Empire
Canadian physical chemists
1866 births
1940 deaths
Fellows of the Royal Society of Canada